The 1954–55 season was the 17th season of competitive association football in the Football League played by Chester, an English club based in Chester, Cheshire.

It was the club's 17th consecutive season in the Third Division North since the election to the Football League. Alongside competing in the league, the club also participated in the FA Cup and the Welsh Cup.

Football League

Results summary

Results by matchday

Matches

FA Cup

Welsh Cup

Season statistics

References

1954-55
English football clubs 1954–55 season